Chrysoclista monotyla is a moth of the family Agonoxenidae. It was described by Edward Meyrick in 1921. It is found in Australia (Queensland).

References

Moths described in 1921
Agonoxeninae
Moths of Australia